Return Journey is an Australian film about the Burke and Wills expedition. It was directed by William Sterling and produced by John Sherman.

In 1961 filming began with a cast of four and a crew including Sterling and cameraman Gerry Vandenberg. Filming took place near Alice Springs. They had $12,000 in funds. The plan was to film it on 16 mm and blow it up to 35mm. Filming was difficult - there was trouble with the camera, colour stock and sound track.

The filmmakers did not have enough money to complete the feature film so it was recut as a documentary. In 1966, when John Sherman died, Colin Bennett claimed he had seen three different versions and said the best was a 30 minute documentary version. However at that stage the film had not yet been released.

Cast
Edward Brayshaw as Wills
Peter Carver as Burke
Syd Conabere as King
David Mitchell as Gray

References

External links
Return Journey at National Film and Sound Archive

Australian documentary films
Films directed by William Sterling (director)
1965 films
1965 documentary films